Gary Coyne (born 30 September 1961) is an Australian former professional rugby league footballer who played in the 1980s and 1990s. An Australia international and Queensland State of Origin representative forward, he played club football in the Brisbane Rugby League for the Wynnum-Manly Seagulls (with whom he won the 1984 premiership) and in the New South Wales Rugby League for the Canberra Raiders (with whom he won the 1989 and 1990 premierships).

Playing career
Originally from Ipswich, Coyne was a part of Canberra's competition-winning side of the 1989 and 1990 seasons. Coyne also played for the club in two further grand finals which both ended in defeat which were the 1987 and 1991 deciders.

In the 1989 post season he travelled with the Canberra club to England for the 1989 World Club Challenge which was lost to Widnes. He also played in two Test matches for Australia in 1991 and 11 State of Origin games for Queensland between 1989 and 1992.

Coyne was named a member of Canberra's 25-man "Dream Team" in 2007, as part of the club's 25th anniversary of their entry into first-grade rugby league.

In the 1991 semifinal against the Manly-Warringah Sea Eagles, Coyne went over for his 4th and final try of the match after Canberra legend Mal Meninga took a tap instead of the expected shot at goal. Manly were stunned and seen out of the 1991 season. Meninga can be seen casually approaching Coyne and suggesting something as the Manly players walk towards the posts, backs turned.

Post playing
Currently, Coyne is a franchisee owner of McDonald's family restaurants in Kallangur, Warner, Strathpine, Deception Bay, North Lakes, North Lakes Business Park, North Lakes Westfield and Murrumba Downs.

References

External links
Queensland Representatives at qrl.com.au

1961 births
Living people
Australian rugby league players
Rugby league players from Ipswich, Queensland
Wynnum Manly Seagulls players
Queensland Rugby League State of Origin players
Canberra Raiders players
Australia national rugby league team players
Rugby league second-rows